Ózd is a district in western part of Borsod-Abaúj-Zemplén County. Ózd is also the name of the town where the district seat is found. The district is located in the Northern Hungary Statistical Region.

Geography 
Ózd District borders with the Slovakian region of Banská Bystrica to the northwest, Edelény District to the northeast, Kazincbarcika District to the east, Bélapátfalva District and Pétervására District (Heves County) to the south, Salgótarján District (Nógrád County) to the west. The number of the inhabited places in Ózd District is 17.

Municipalities 
The district has 2 towns, 1 large village and 14 villages.
(ordered by population, as of 1 January 2012)

The bolded municipalities are cities, italics municipality is large village.

Demographics

In 2011, it had a population of 54,285 and the population density was 141/km².

Ethnicity
Besides the Hungarian majority, the main minorities are the Roma (approx. 7,000) and German (200).

Total population (2011 census): 54,285
Ethnic groups (2011 census): Identified themselves: 54,404 persons:
Hungarians: 47,043 (86.47%)
Gypsies: 6,808 (12.51%)
Others and indefinable: 553 (1.02%)
Approx. 150 persons in Ózd District did declare more than one ethnic group at the 2011 census.

Religion
Religious adherence in the county according to 2011 census:

Catholic – 25,396 (Roman Catholic – 24,485; Greek Catholic – 909);
Reformed – 3,548; 
Evangelical – 305;
other religions – 1,435; 
Non-religious – 9,949; 
Atheism – 459;
Undeclared – 13,193.

Gallery

See also
List of cities and towns of Hungary
Ózd Subregion (until 2013)

References

External links
 Postal codes of the Ózd District

Districts in Borsod-Abaúj-Zemplén County